Patrick James Bamford (born 5 September 1993) is an English professional footballer who plays as a striker for  club Leeds United and the England national team.

Bamford began his career at Nottingham Forest, making his debut in December 2011, at the age of 18. A month later he joined Chelsea for a fee of £1.5 million. He was loaned out to Milton Keynes Dons, Derby County, and Middlesbrough, winning the Championship Player of the Year for the 2014–15 season. Bamford then had further loans at Premier League clubs Crystal Palace, Norwich City and Burnley, but saw limited playing time.

After five years at the club without making a first-team appearance, Bamford left Chelsea and returned to Middlesbrough for a fee in the region of £5.5 million in January 2017. He subsequently joined Leeds United in July 2018 for a fee possibly rising to £10 million, and helped the club win the Championship title during the 2019–20 season and gain promotion to the Premier League.

Bamford was capped by the Republic of Ireland at under-18 level before changing allegiances to England. He has represented England from under-18 to senior level, making his senior debut in September 2021.

Early life
Bamford was born in Grantham, Lincolnshire, and raised in the small, nearby village of Norwell, Nottinghamshire. He joined Nottingham Forest's academy as an eight-year-old after playing junior football for Muskham Cougars. He attended the independent fee-paying Nottingham High School, where due to the lack of a school football team, he played rugby union as a full-back, until the end of Year 10. Bamford ended up with five A*s, three As and two Bs in his GCSEs. He studied French, History, Biology and General Studies at A-Level and attained 3 Bs and a C. Bamford was offered a place  at Harvard University and on the Harvard Men's Soccer team, but he rejected the offer to continue his career in England.

Described by the Yorkshire Evening Post in 2018 as "not your typical footballer", he plays the piano, violin, guitar and saxophone, and is conversational in French, Spanish and German. He has said that his more privileged upbringing has led him to be treated differently in a sport where most players are from the working class.

Club career

Nottingham Forest
Bamford was an unused substitute during Forest's League Cup third round tie against Newcastle United at the City Ground on 21 September 2011, a 4–3 defeat after extra time. He made his Forest debut against Cardiff City in a 1–0 home defeat on 31 December, coming on as a substitute for Matt Derbyshire with 12 minutes remaining.
He appeared in Forest's next game on 2 January 2012, coming on again as an added-time substitute for Andy Reid as Forest beat Ipswich Town 3–1 at Portman Road.

Chelsea
On 31 January 2012, Bamford joined Chelsea on a five-year contract for a fee of £1.5 million. On 8 February 2012, he started to train with Chelsea's first-team squad. He made his debut for the reserves in a friendly against Gillingham at Cobham, with Chelsea emerging victorious 5–4. Bamford netted his first goal in Chelsea colours, rounding off a tidy team move and also scored his second, the winner from the penalty spot. On 21 July 2015, Bamford signed a new three-year contract with Chelsea before being loaned out to Crystal Palace for the upcoming season.

Loan to Milton Keynes Dons
On 22 November 2012, he signed on loan at Milton Keynes Dons (MK Dons) until 7 January. He made his debut three days later against Colchester United, and ended the match with three assists. Manager Karl Robinson said that he hoped Bamford would stay until the end of season.

On 31 January 2013, Bamford's loan was extended until 20 May, having impressed enough before sustaining a hamstring injury. On 19 March, he netted the first goal of his professional career at Crewe Alexandra's Gresty Road.

On 1 July, Bamford rejoined MK Dons on loan until 5 January 2014. Bamford scored 14 league goals in 23 appearances for MK Dons during this six-month period, and thus was the subject of speculation that he would be sent on loan to a club at a higher level. On 31 December, Karl Robinson confirmed that Bamford would not be returning to MK Dons after his loan deal expired. His new club was later announced as Derby County. He made his last appearance for Milton Keynes on 4 January 2014, where he scored his 17th goal of the season in the closing stages of a 3–3 draw against the holders Wigan Athletic in the third round of the FA Cup.

Loan to Derby County
On 3 January 2014, Derby County confirmed the signing of Bamford on a loan until the end of the season. Bamford made his debut for Derby as a substitute on 10 January, in a 4–1 away defeat to Leicester City. His first goal came in his next game, at home to Brighton & Hove Albion, when he opened the scoring in the 76th minute after coming on as a 59th-minute substitute for Simon Dawkins. He dedicated the goal to his godfather, former Nottingham Forest chairman Nigel Doughty. On 24 January, Bamford won the Football League Young Player of the Month award for December following his performances on loan at MK Dons. One day later, he scored his 19th goal of the season in a 1–1 draw against Blackburn Rovers. Bamford continued his great form, scoring in the next two matches, against Yeovil Town on 28 January and against Birmingham City on 1 February. On 18 February, Bamford's strike earned Derby a 1–0 win at Hillsborough against Sheffield Wednesday. However, he failed to score in the next six games for Derby, but on 25 March, he scored in a 2–1 loss against Ipswich. In the next game on 29 March against Charlton Athletic, he scored the second of three goals, capitalising on an error by the captain Johnnie Jackson in the 38th minute. Bamford continued his goalscoring form as he netted his 25th of the season away from home against Blackpool on 8 April.

Loan to Middlesbrough

On 29 August 2014, Bamford joined Middlesbrough on loan until 1 January. Bamford made his debut as a substitute on 30 August 2014, in a 1–0 home defeat to Reading. On 20 September he scored his debut goal for Boro in his first start for the club: a 4–0 home win over Brentford.

Bamford replaced Grant Leadbitter for the final eight minutes of extra time in the third round of the League Cup against Liverpool on 23 September. In added time, he was fouled by Kolo Touré for a penalty which he converted himself to make the score 2–2, thus resulting in a penalty shootout. Although his penalty in the shoot-out was saved by Simon Mignolet, he scored one in sudden death, but Middlesbrough lost 14–13 on penalties.

After scoring in the League Cup against Liverpool on 23 September, Bamford went through a dry period of four games without scoring. On 1 November, he scored the opening goal in a 3–0 win over Rotherham United. He scored again three days later against Norwich City in a 4–0 win for Boro. On 22 November, Bamford came off the bench in the 55th minute against Wigan Athletic, and within three minutes of coming onto the pitch, scored the goal which levelled the game, the match ending in a 1–1 draw. Bamford continued his fine scoring form, scoring Boro’s only goal on 29 November to share the points with Blackburn Rovers and on 6 December in a 5-1 win at The Den against Millwall: four goals in five games.

Bamford again continued to impress during the game against league leaders Derby County on 13 December, in which he scored the opening goal within the first six minutes, and later won a penalty which was converted by Leadbitter in a 2–0 win. The result moved his team into 2nd place in the Championship, level on points with Bournemouth. On 31 December, his loan was extended for the remainder of the season.

On 24 January 2015, in the fourth round of the FA Cup, Bamford exploited an error by Fernando to open the scoring as Middlesbrough defeated reigning Premier League champions Manchester City 2–0 away.

On 3 April, Bamford sent Middlesbrough to the top of the Championship table by scoring his 17th goal of the season in a 1–0 win against Wigan Athletic. On 11 April, he scored his 18th goal of the season against Rotherham United, but did miss a penalty during stoppage-time after fighting it over with fellow striker Kike who won the penalty originally. Later on, Bamford revealed that he was the designated penalty-taker and apologised to his teammate for missing the penalty. Also that month, he was nominated at the Football League Awards for Championship Player of the Year and Young Player of the Year. He won the first award, with the second going to Dele Alli of Milton Keynes Dons.

Bamford ended the 2014–15 season with 19 goals in total, 17 coming in the league, making him the team's top scorer for the season.

Loan to Crystal Palace
On 21 July 2015, Bamford signed on loan for Crystal Palace for the upcoming season. After a successful pre-season with Crystal Palace, which included a hat-trick against Bromley, Bamford was an unused substitute for Palace's opening match against Norwich City on 8 August. He made his competitive debut for Palace eight days later in a 2–1 home defeat to Arsenal, replacing James McArthur for the final ten minutes.

On 28 December, Bamford terminated his loan spell and returned to Chelsea after featuring as a substitute in the 0–0 draw against Swansea City. Bamford cited lack of first-team opportunities as the reason for his departure. It was subsequently reported that Bamford's decision had been made by himself alone, and that the two clubs involved were to hold talks over his future.

Loan to Norwich City
On 30 January 2016, after terminating his loan spell with Crystal Palace, Bamford joined Norwich City on loan until the end of the season. Bamford was given the number 11 jersey upon arrival. On 6 February 2016, Bamford made his debut for the Canaries in a 2–0 away defeat to Aston Villa, replacing Wes Hoolahan in the 56th minute. On 12 March 2016, he made his first Premier League start in a 0–0 draw with Manchester City, where he had the best opportunity of the game to score with a shot from 25 yards out which hit the bar.

Loan to Burnley
On 30 August 2016, Bamford joined Burnley on a season-long loan. Ten days later, he made his debut by replacing Andre Gray in the 80th minute of a 1–1 draw against Hull City. After making six Premier League appearances, his loan was cut short after he was recalled by Chelsea on 14 January 2017, with Bamford citing a clash of personalities with the Burnley manager Sean Dyche during his spell at the club.

Return to Middlesbrough
On 18 January 2017, Bamford joined Middlesbrough, then in the Premier League, on a four-and-a-half-year deal in the region of £5.5 million, reuniting him with Aitor Karanka. Three days later, he made his debut off the bench in a 3–1 loss against West Ham United. On 8 May 2017, Bamford faced his former team, Chelsea in a 3–0 defeat at Stamford Bridge, resulting in the relegation of Middlesbrough. On 13 May, Bamford made his first start of the season and scored his first ever Premier League goal in a 2–1 loss against Southampton.

After an injury to the lone striker Rudy Gestede in February 2018, during the 2017–18 season, Bamford was moved from out wide to a lone striker role under manager Tony Pulis, where he flourished and, on 2 March 2018, scored his first ever hat-trick against Leeds United. In April, he was nominated for the Player of the Month award for March 2018, but lost out to Fulham striker Aleksandar Mitrović.

Bamford scored 13 goals in 44 appearances in all competitions during the 2017–18 season, to help Middlesbrough reach the Championship play-off semi-finals, where they were eliminated by Aston Villa.

Leeds United

2018–19 season
On 31 July 2018, Bamford joined Leeds United for an undisclosed fee on a four-year contract. He was given the number 9 shirt for the season. The fee was believed to be £7 million (rising up to £10 million depending on bonuses), making Bamford Leeds' most expensive signing since Robbie Fowler had joined Leeds in 2001. He made his debut on 11 August in a 4–1 win at Derby County. On 14 August, Bamford made his first start for Leeds in an EFL Cup fixture against Bolton Wanderers, the game also saw him score his first goal for the club in a 2–1 win.

On 7 September 2018, Bamford started for the Leeds United under-23 team against Bristol City. He scored the first goal of the game in a 5–0 win, but hobbled off the pitch after half an hour with a suspected knee injury. The following week, Leeds announced that the striker had suffered a posterior cruciate ligament injury and was facing four months on the sidelines.

On 15 December, Bamford returned from his cruciate ligament injury as a second-half substitute against Bolton, opening the scoring for his first league goal for the club in a 1–0 win. However, he picked up another knee ligament injury in training before the following game against Aston Villa and was ruled out for several weeks.

Bamford made a return from injury to first-team action on 2 February 2019, scoring in a 3–1 defeat against Norwich City. He made his first start for Leeds in the league, in Leeds' 1–1 draw against his old side Middlesbrough on 9 February 2019.

He took his tally to six goals for the season (one in an EFL Cup home tie in August against Bolton), after scoring a brace in a 4–0 win against West Bromwich Albion on 1 March. Despite following up with the game's only goal at Bristol City a week later, Bamford's form slumped during March, and included a missed penalty at Elland Road against Millwall on 30 March, but he scored both goals in a powerful display in Leeds's 2–0 win at Preston on 9 April and, in his 200th professional appearance, Leeds' only goal in their shock 1–2 defeat by 10-man Wigan 10 days later.

On 30 April 2019, the Football Association handed Bamford a two-match ban after charging him with "successful deception of a match official" during the home game against Aston Villa in which Bamford feigned injury in a fracas involving Anwar El Ghazi. El Ghazi's red card was later rescinded by the FA and Bamford received a two-match ban for deception. Replays showed that Bamford had dived to the ground clutching his face despite no contact being made.

During the 2018–19 season, Bamford played 25 games in all competitions, scoring 10 goals in an injury-hit season after Leeds finished the regular season in third place, having dropped out of the automatic promotion places with three games left following a defeat to 10-man Wigan on 19 April. Leeds qualified for the playoffs and, with Bamford out suspended, Kemar Roofe started the first leg of the Championship play-offs at Pride Park on 11 May 2019, netting the sole goal of the game against sixth-placed Derby County for Roofe's 15th goal of the season.

But Roofe was replaced in the starting line-up of the Elland Road return leg by a returning (from suspension) Bamford, after Roofe picked up an injury in the second half of the 1–0 win at Pride Park. However, Leeds were beaten 4–3 on aggregate over the two legs: with Roofe out injured, Leeds lost the home leg 4–2 in an encounter that saw both teams reduced to 10 men and Derby progress to the final against Aston Villa (which Villa won, joining already-promoted Norwich City and Sheffield United in the Premier League for the 2019–20 season). Bamford finished the season with 13 goals across 44 games for Leeds.

In August 2019, Bamford was one of the main stars of the Amazon Prime documentary Take Us Home, telling the story of the 2018–19 season. He featured in several episodes, and the series was narrated by Academy Award-winning actor and Leeds fan Russell Crowe.

2019–20 season
Citing the fact that he was now "focused on being a lot more aggressive" after the summer, Bamford scored his first goal of the 2019–20 season on 4 August in Leeds' opening day 3–1 victory against Bristol City. With both goals to his name in the away tie at Wigan on 17 August and a goal at Stoke the following week, Bamford brought his tally to four league goals from five Championship games.

His performances saw him one of six players nominated in September for the Championship PFA Player of the Month for August 2019; however, Bamford lost out to his teammate Ben White who won the award on 4 September.

With criticism of Bamford building following the striker's three-game goal drought and Derby's 91st-minute equaliser at Elland Road on 21 September 2019, head coach Marcelo Bielsa noted through his translator at the post-game press conference, that "if we want to analyse, we cannot avoid to have this talk," concerning the attacking issues of the current team. "Maybe we can be more efficient with [Bamford and Nketiah] in the team," he noted about the 1–1 result where, having dominated possession yet squandering at least 10 goalscoring opportunities to Derby's one shot on goal – by half-time, Leeds had had 71% possession – Bielsa continued that:

Referring to the 79th-minute substitution of Eddie Nketiah for Bamford, Bielsa noted: "When I put Nketiah on the pitch I was thinking [of] taking out Klich and that Eddie and Bamford play together – Bamford behind Eddie. Bamford [took] this decision: he has to be combine[d] and he's starting to know some players, in the case of Nketiah for example, he needs to know how he combines with ... both of them." Teammate Kalvin Phillips in a separate interview after the same game, believed that "Pat's played very well today, to be honest. I think he was unlucky to be brought off but I think, you know, once Pat starts scoring, once he gets a goal or two, he'll just fly, because he's getting in them positions where one's going to go in eventually." Bamford, however, did not manage to find the net in September or October and in nearly every game during those two months was substituted, mostly by Nketiah, at various points in the second half, but his 30th-minute penalty against Blackburn on 9 November at Elland Road (in which he also provided the final ball for Jack Harrison's game-winning goal just five minutes later) broke a 10-game goal scoring drought for the centre-forward and he recorded his tenth goal of the season in Leeds's pre-Christmas 2–1 loss at Fulham.

Coming on as a half-time replacement for Nketiah on 1 January 2020, in the Arsenal loanee's final game for Leeds at then-second-placed West Brom, Bamford had an immediate impact, heading home Leeds's sole goal of the game (although a deflection saw it counted as an own goal). The 1–1 result kept Leeds on top of the table on goal difference.

However, with the departure of Nketiah, Bamford's profligacy in front of goal during the 0–2 home loss to Sheffield Wednesday on 11 January, and in the 1–0 loss at Loftus Road seven days later (where he missed a penalty), brought the club's striking options into sharp focus, although by March he had found the net again: in Leeds' 2–0 win over Huddersfield Town.

The English professional football season was paused in March 2020 due to the impact of the COVID-19 pandemic and resumed three months later. Leeds' first home game following that break was on 27 June, when Bamford scored the 10th-minute opening goal in their 3–0 victory over then-fourth-placed Fulham. This scoreline restored Leeds to the top of the Championship division table. The following week, Bamford opened the scoring again as Leeds beat Blackburn 3–1. The interrupted 2019–20 season was eventually completed in late July, and Bamford finished the season with 16 goals, making him Leeds United's top scorer by a large margin. The club won the Championship title, thereby returning to the Premier League after a 16-year absence.

2020–21 season
Bamford started the first three Premier League fixtures of Leeds United's season, scoring in each game: against Liverpool (netting the second goal in a 4–3 away defeat), against Fulham, in a 4–3 home win and, with a late header at Bramall Lane, in a 1–0 win over Sheffield United. On 2 October 2020, Bamford was nominated for Premier League Player of the Month for the three goals and one assist he had in September but lost out to Everton’s Dominic Calvert-Lewin.

In Leeds' second game back after the international break, Bamford scored his first Premier League hat trick, in a 3–0 away win on 23 October over Aston Villa. He was the winner of the Professional Footballers' Association Fans' Bristol Street Motors Premier League Player of the Month for September and October and scored his 100th professional goal on 8 February 2021, netting Leeds' second in their 2–0 defeat of Crystal Palace.

Bamford ended the season with 17 league goals (joint-fourth with Son Heung-min, behind Bruno Fernandes, Mohamed Salah and the season's top scorer, Harry Kane), his highest career goal return since scoring 17 goals with Middlesbrough during the 2014–15 season in the Championship, and the first player to score as many goals for a newly promoted side since Charlie Austin scored 18 goals for Queens Park Rangers in the 2014–15 season. Bamford played in all 38 league fixtures, starting almost every game, with Bielsa occasionally bringing on Tyler Roberts as a tactical substitute for him in the first few weeks of the season, and Rodrigo proving to be a prolifically goal-scoring substitute for Bamford in the season's final fixtures.

2021–22 season
On 19 August 2021, Bamford signed a new five-year contract with Leeds. He scored his first goal of the season on 29 August with an 86th-minute equaliser in a 1–1 draw at Burnley. However, a 17 September ankle injury in a 1–1 draw at Newcastle United, a game in which Luke Ayling also suffered a knee injury, saw Bamford sidelined into November while a variety of forwards, including Rodrigo, Raphinha and Joe Gelhardt were tried in various combinations. In his 5 December return game, where he came on as a 68th-minute substitute for Junior Firpo, Bamford netted the 95th-minute equaliser in a 2–2 home draw with Brentford. Coincidentally, the Brentford tie also marked Ayling's return, and the defender provided the assist for Bamford. However, the striker injured his hip in the post-goal celebration, which ruled him out for the remainder of December’s games and in January 2022 he suffered sole of the foot issues and did not play any games that month or February either. 

On 5 March, Bamford made his return to the bench as an unused substitute in Jesse Marsch’s first game in charge (a 1-0 defeat at the King Power Stadium), the striker’s first time named in the squad since December, and on 10 March he came on as a 58th minute substitute for Jack Harrison. Three days later, Bamford started his first game in almost six months — in Leeds’s dramatic 2-1 win at Elland Road against Norwich City — before being substituted by Robin Koch in the 60th minute. However, his start in the game on 18 March at Molineux saw him in visible pain from the whistle and led to him being substituted by Sam Greenwood in the 23rd minute. In a wide-ranging interview with BBC Radio Leeds on 9 April 2022, following his re-injury against Wolves, he spoke of the injuries he had suffered during his blighted season, specifically the Wolves game:

Bamford made no further appearances for Leeds in the 2021-22 season, although he was in contention in the lineup for the crucial, final game of the season when he was stricken with a bad case of Covid.

2022–23 season
Bamford’s litany of injuries continued into the new season: in his 13 August game at Southampton, he was substituted by Dan James in the first half with an adductor injury and in the eight subsequent appearances he made, he started only two of them, remaining on the pitch for just over an hour in both cases.

In Leeds’ 2-1 defeat away to Aston Villa on 13 January 2023, Bamford came off the bench, making an appearance for the first time since groin surgery in October, to score Leeds’ only goal of the game, his 100th career goal and his first in any competition since December 2021. 

Handed the captain’s armband when he came in as a second-half replacement for Rodrigo, Bamford scored Leeds’ fourth and fifth in their 5–2 win at Elland Road over Cardiff in the F.A. Cup third round replay on 18 January 2023.

International career
Bamford played for the Republic of Ireland once at under-18 level, as he qualifies to play for Ireland under the grandparent rule. On 28 February 2012, Bamford made his first appearance for the England under-19s in a friendly against the Czech Republic. He was brought on at half time and 20 minutes into the second half Chelsea teammate Todd Kane put a cross into the box which Bamford firmly headed into the goal, scoring his first England under-19 goal. On 17 November 2013, he was called up to the England under-21 team for the first time for a game against San Marino under-21s after a fantastic start to the season, having scored 12 goals in 20 appearances. Two days later, Bamford made his under-21s debut, coming on as a 65th-minute substitute in a 9–0 win over San Marino.

Bamford was included in Gareth Southgate's 27-man preliminary squad for the 2015 UEFA European Under-21 Championship, but was excluded from the final squad due to injury.

In March and July 2018, Republic of Ireland manager Martin O'Neill revealed he and assistant manager Roy Keane had been scouting Bamford, as they were looking into the possibility of calling him up to the Republic of Ireland squad, should the striker change allegiance back to the Ireland national team. On 23 December 2018, new Republic of Ireland manager Mick McCarthy confirmed he would be speaking to Bamford about calling him up to the national team, and on 7 March 2019 McCarthy claimed that Bamford would be switching his allegiance back to Ireland. McCarthy said in June 2019 that he was still waiting for Bamford to make a decision about playing for Ireland, saying that he was "refusing to chase" him with former Leeds and Republic of Ireland striker Robbie Keane saying: "He should be chasing us. He should want to come here. If he doesn't want to, no problem. We shouldn't be chasing people, by the way."

In October 2020, Bamford said in an interview that it "would be a dream [come true]" to play for England and make the England squad for UEFA Euro 2020 (later postponed until 2021 due to the COVID-19 pandemic). He also said that he would aim to make the squad but was not named as one of Gareth Southgate's squad of 26 players, nor his provisional 33-player-squad, announced on 25 May 2021.

In August 2021, Bamford was called up for the England national team for the first time ahead of September's 2022 FIFA World Cup qualifiers against Hungary, Andorra and Poland. His debut came against Andorra on 5 September 2021, where he started and played 62 minutes of the 4–0 victory at Wembley Stadium (he was not named for the game against Hungary, but was an unused substitute in the Poland game in Warsaw on 8 September).

Style of play
Bamford is a versatile forward, who can play as a lone striker (which is how he was almost exclusively utilised by Marcelo Bielsa) or in a pair, and can also play in an attacking midfield position or on either wing. He is known for his technique and ability on the ball and his delivery of assists, as well as his proficiency in the air. Although deployed as a solitary striker, Bamford also provides one of the highest rates of assists for a player in his position in the Premier League.

Preferring to let the ball run and delivering a strike as his first touch, the vast majority of Bamford’s goals — and all of his penalties — are scored with his left foot, although he scores extensively with his head and, to a lesser extent, his right foot.

Personal life
Bamford became a father in 2022: “I had a little girl at the start of February. Really it was kind of perfect timing, cos I was injured, so I could get used to the non-sleep thing.”

Career statistics

Club

International

Honours
Leeds United
EFL Championship: 2019–20

Individual
Football League One Player of the Month: October 2013
Football League Young Player of the Month: December 2013
Football League Championship Player of the Year: 2014–15

References

External links

Profile at the Leeds United F.C. website
Profile at the Football Association website

1993 births
Living people
People from Grantham
Footballers from Lincolnshire
English footballers
England youth international footballers
England under-21 international footballers
England international footballers
Republic of Ireland association footballers
Republic of Ireland youth international footballers
Association football forwards
Nottingham Forest F.C. players
Chelsea F.C. players
Milton Keynes Dons F.C. players
Derby County F.C. players
Middlesbrough F.C. players
Crystal Palace F.C. players
Norwich City F.C. players
Burnley F.C. players
Leeds United F.C. players
English Football League players
Premier League players
English people of Irish descent
People educated at Nottingham High School